Belton High School may refer to:

Belton High School (Missouri), located in Belton, Missouri
Belton High School (Texas), located in Belton, Texas
Belton-Honea Path High School, located in Honea Path, South Carolina